The 2000–01 season is the fifth in the history of the Glasgow Warriors as a professional side. During this season the young professional side competed as Glasgow Caledonians; the last time they would use that name.

The 2000–01 season saw Glasgow Caledonians compete in the competitions: the Welsh-Scottish League and the European Champions Cup, the Heineken Cup for sponsorship reasons.

Season Overview

Team

Coaches

Head coach:  Richie Dixon 
Assistant coach:  Rob Moffat
Assistant coach:  Gordon Macpherson

Squad

Academy players

Glasgow once again sent a group of youngsters to study rugby in New Zealand for the summer of 2001.

The Glasgow Thistles squad for the coming year:

P Burke, A Reid, A McKay (all Ayr), M Gallacher, F Hamilton, S Martin, J Nellany (all High School of Glasgow), G Hutton, C Miller (both Glasgow Academy), S Forrest, G Lindsay, S Male (all Cambuslang), D Mitchell (Hillhead/Jordanhill), D Monaghan, P Nicol (both Whitecraigs), D Naismith, S Rushforth (both Kelvinside Academy), S Ross (Helensburgh), S Smith (Glasgow Hawks), Alasdair Strokosch (East Kilbride), K Weir (Glasgow Academicals), G White (Stewartry).

Player statistics

During the 2000–01 season, Glasgow have used 44 different players in competitive games. The table below shows the number of appearances and points scored by each player.

Staff movements

Coaches

Personnel In

None.

Personnel Out

None.

Player movements

Academy promotions

Player transfers

In

 James McLaren from  CS Bourgoin
 Guy Perrett return from study sabbatical
 Graeme Kiddie from  Boroughmuir
 Andrew Welsh from  East Kilbride

Out

 Mark McKenzie to  Nice
 Alan Brown to  Dundee HSFP

Competitions

Pre-season and friendlies

Match 1

Glasgow Caledonians:15 Rowen Shepherd 14 James Craig 13 Jon Stuart 12 Ian Jardine 11 Ian McInroy 10 Craig Chalmers 9 Graeme Beveridge 1 David Hilton 2 Gavin Scott 3 Willie Anderson 4 Darren Burns 5 Steve Griffiths 6 Martin Waite 8 Jon Petrie 7 Gareth Flockhart Replacements: Craig Sangster Matt McGrandles Fraser Stott Roland Reid Alan Watt Gordon Bulloch Used: A Watt for Anderson 50. R Reid for Petrie 57. C Sangster for Shepherd 60. F Stott for Beveridge 66. C Stewart for Griffiths 66.

Match 2

Glasgow Caledonians:Craig Sangster; James Craig, Matt McGrandles, Rowen Shepherd (captain), Ian McInroy; Mark McKenzie, Fraser Stott; David Hilton, Gordon Bulloch, Lee Harrison, Colin Stewart, Steven Griffiths, Martin Waite, Roland Reid, Donnie Macfadyen. Replacements – Jon Stuart for James Craig (13 minutes), Alan Watt for Hilton (half-time), Darren Burns for Griffiths (54), Gavin Scott for Waite (56).

Match 3

Glasgow Caledonians:  R.Shepherd; J.Craig, J.Stuart, I.Jardine, I. McInroy; M.McKenzie, F.Stott; A.Watt, G.Scott, W.Anderson, D.Burns, C.Stewart (S.Griffiths 59), R.Reid, D.Macfadyen (G.Flockhart 54) J.Petrie. Replacements (not used): 
Matt McGrandles Craig Chalmers Graeme Beveridge David Hilton Gordon Bulloch

Winning all 3 matches on the Canadian tour won Glasgow Warriors the Coastal Cup.

Match 4

Northampton Saints:  M Tucker; C Moir, A Bateman, M Allen, L Martin; P Grayson, D Malone; G Pagel, S Thompson, M Scelzo, T Rodber, O Brouzet, G Seely, B Pountney, P Lam. Substitutes used – M Stewart, S Brotherstone, J Phillips, R Hunter, A Rennick, J Bamhall, S Webster, I Vass, M Soden, T Kirk.

Glasgow Caledonians:  T Hayes; J Craig, R Shepherd, I Jardine, S Longstaff; C Chalmers, G Beveridge; D Hilton, G Bulloch, G McIlwham, S Griffiths, J White, G Flockhart, D Macfadyen, J Petrie. Substitutes used – R Reid, M McKenzie, D Burns.

Match 5

Glasgow Caledonians:T Hayes; J Craig, R Shepherd (I Jardine 2–3), J Stuart, R Reid; M McKenzie, G Beveridge (F Stott 71); A Watt, G Scott (G Bulloch 54), W Anderson (G McIlwham 40), C Stewart (D Burns 40), J White, G Simpson (D Hilton 54–64), D Macfadyen (G Flockhart 17), J Petrie.

Munster: D Crotty; J O'Neill (P Bracken 56), J Kelly, J Holland, A Horgan; R O'Gara (Stringer 76), P Stringer (M Prendegast 72); M Horan (D O'Sullivan 56), F Sheahan, P Clohessy, M Galway, J Langford, A Quinlan, D Wallace (C McMahon 56), A Foley.

European Champions Cup

Pool 6

Results

Round 1

Round 2

Round 3

Round 4

Round 5

Round 6

Welsh-Scottish League

The top 5 Welsh teams plus Glasgow and Edinburgh qualified for next season's Heineken Cup.

2000 – 01 League Table

Results

The Round 9 match of the 25 November 2000 which was abandoned is shown here for completeness. The abandoned match and its related statistics are not included in player or squad statistics.

Round 1

Round 2

Round 3

Round 4

Round 5

Round 6

Round 7

Round 8

Round 9

Round 10

Round 11

Round 12

Round 13

Round 14

Round 15

Round 16

Round 17

Round 18

Round 19

Round 20

Round 21

Round 22

Competitive debuts this season

A player's nationality shown is taken from the nationality at the highest honour for the national side obtained; or if never capped internationally their place of birth. Senior caps take precedence over junior caps or place of birth; junior caps take precedence over place of birth. A player's nationality at debut may be different from the nationality shown. Combination sides like the British and Irish Lions or Pacific Islanders are not national sides, or nationalities.

Players in BOLD font have been capped by their senior international XV side as nationality shown.

Players in Italic font have capped either by their international 7s side; or by the international XV 'A' side as nationality shown.

Players in normal font have not been capped at senior level.

A position in parentheses indicates that the player debuted as a substitute. A player may have made a prior debut for Glasgow Warriors in a non-competitive match, 'A' match or 7s match; these matches are not listed.

Tournaments where competitive debut made:

Crosshatching indicates a jointly hosted match.

Sponsorship

Official Kit Supplier

Canterbury

References

2000-01
2000–01 in Scottish rugby union
2000–01 Heineken Cup